Primates in the Anglican Communion are the most senior bishop or archbishop of one of the 41 churches of the Anglican Communion. The Church of England, however, has two primates, the Archbishop of Canterbury and the Archbishop of York.

Variations
Some of these churches are stand-alone ecclesiastical provinces (such as the Church of the Province of West Africa), while others are national churches comprising several ecclesiastical provinces (such as the Church of England). Since 1978, the Anglican primates have met annually for an Anglican Communion Primates' Meeting at the invitation of the Archbishop of Canterbury, who is regarded as the symbolic leader (though primus-inter-pares) of the Anglican primates. While the gathering has no legal jurisdiction, it acts as one of the informal instruments of unity among the autonomous provinces of the communion.

In stand-alone ecclesiastical provinces, the primate is the metropolitan archbishop of the province. In national churches composed of several ecclesiastical provinces, the primate will be senior to the metropolitan archbishops of the various provinces, and may also be a metropolitan archbishop. In those churches which do not have a tradition of archiepiscopacy, the primate is a bishop styled "primus" (in the case of the Scottish Episcopal Church), "presiding bishop", "president bishop", "prime bishop" or simply "primate". In the case of the Episcopal Church in the United States, which is composed of several ecclesiastical provinces, there is a presiding bishop who is its primate, but the individual provinces are not led by metropolitans.

Anglican primates may be attached to a fixed see (e.g., the Archbishop of Canterbury is invariably the Primate of All England), who may be chosen from among sitting metropolitans or diocesan bishops and retain the see (as with, for example, the Primate of the Anglican Church of Australia), or who may have no see (as in the Anglican Church of Canada). Primates are generally chosen by election (either by a synod consisting of laity, clergy and bishops, or by a House of Bishops). In some instances, the primacy is awarded on the basis of seniority among the episcopal college. In the Church of England, the primate, like all bishops, is appointed by the British sovereign, in the capacity of Supreme Governor of the established church, on the advice of the Crown Appointments Commission.

The United Churches of South India, of North India, of Pakistan and of Bangladesh have neither metropolitan (arch)bishops nor national primates. Instead, each has a Moderator of the Synod (and a Vice-Moderator), elected from among the bishops for a fixed term, who is ranked among the Anglican primates.

Dual primates
In the Church of England and the Church of Ireland, the metropolitan of the second province has since medieval times also been accorded the title of primate. In England, the Archbishop of Canterbury is known as the "Primate of All England"  while the Archbishop of York as "Primate of England" (see also Primacy of Canterbury). In Ireland both the Anglican and Roman Catholic Archbishops of Armagh are titled "Primate of All Ireland"; while both the Anglican and Roman Catholic Archbishops of Dublin are titled "Primate of Ireland". As both of these positions pre-date the 1921 partition, they relate to the whole of Ireland. The junior primates of these churches do not normally participate in the Primates' Meeting.

List of current primates

This is a list of the 42 current primates (including four moderators of united churches) in the worldwide Anglican Communion. The list is given according to the Anglican order of precedence, with the Archbishop of Canterbury as primus inter pares first and the others in order of seniority by their first installation to a primacy.

See also
Anglican Communion
List of current patriarchs

Notes

References

External links
Anglican Communion - Primates
Anglican Online

Anglican primates